Oscar Wayne Tyrone (born August 1, 1950) is a former Major League Baseball player. He played in the 1976 baseball season with the Chicago Cubs. Tyrone batted and threw right-handed. He played in 30 games in his one-year career, having a .228 batting average. He is the brother of former Major Leaguer, Jim Tyrone.

External links

Chicago Cubs players
1950 births
Living people
Major League Baseball outfielders
Baseball players from Texas
Miami Amigos players
UT Rio Grande Valley Vaqueros baseball players
People from Alice, Texas